West Coast is a subzone located in the town of Clementi, the western part of Singapore. The subzone currently lies in the West Coast GRC.

History
West Coast was created out of reclaimed land in the 1970s. Despite both being created out of reclaimed land, the east became a recreational area but the west was filled with industries. The western part of West Coast is largely industrial but the eastern and central parts of the area are mostly filled with private housing along with a single HDB estate.

Amenities

Commercial Facilities
Few amenities exist in the vicinity of private houses and condominiums along West Coast, such as Clementiwoods and Terra Hill. However, a town centre exists in the heart of the HDB housing estate. It consists of two-storey shophouses on Jalan Mas Puteh, Ayer Rajah Food Centre, Ayer Rajah Market, West Coast Community Centre, the Ang Chee Sia Ong Temple, Wu Tai Shan Temple (五台山佛公寺), West Coast Recreational Centre and the well-known West Coast Market Square. West Coast Plaza (formerly known as Ginza Plaza) lies across the market. There are also Buddhist centres like Singapore Buddhist Meditation Centre and Jayamangala Buddhist Vihara in the town.

During weekends, people from other parts of Clementi and the private housing sectors of West Coast will patronise the town centre, which makes it very prosperous and busy. Its hawker centre offers a nice variety of food and popular stalls include the ones selling carrot cake, nasi lemak and satay.

Transport & Accessibility

West Coast is well connected with an array of road networks. There are two parallel primary roads which serve West Coast: West Coast Road and West Coast Highway. Ayer Rajah Expressway is located along the northern boundary of Clementi West. Jalan Buroh and Penjuru Road are located towards the western end of West Coast, where Pandan is located.

West Coast is also connected by a diverse network of public transportation. SBS Transit services 30, 51, 175, 196, 197, 198  SMRT services 176, 188, 963 and Tower Transit services 78, 97, 143, 282, 285 travels through or loops around West Coast and many of the mentioned bus services links West Coast to Clementi MRT station as well as Clementi Bus Interchange.

Recreation

There is a wide variety of sports and recreational facilities around West Coast. Clementi Stadium hosts a football field and running track. Squash courts and bowling facilities(West Bowl) can be found at West Coast Recreational Centre. West Coast Park and Clementi Woods Park also hold facilities for cycling and a dog run for pups to play. There are also several fitness corners throughout West Coast.

Enjoyment is also another important factor. Children playgrounds are commonly in HDB estates, as well as an array of bizarre adventure playgrounds that can be found in West Coast Park.

Education
There are several primary and secondary schools throughout West Coast, but the subzone does not have Junior Colleges and Polytechnics. And also due to the large population of international citizens in West Coast, two international schools had been set up. As of 2008, there are 4 former schools which have since either merged, named changed, moved or closed down.

Primary Schools includes:
 Qifa Primary School

Secondary Schools includes:
 Kent Ridge Secondary School
 Tanglin Secondary School
 Commonwealth Secondary School

Japanese Schools includes:
 The Japanese Secondary School
 Waseda Shibuya Senior High School

International Schools:
 International Community School

Former Schools:
 Jin Tai Primary School - Merged with Qifa Primary School in 2008.
 Jin Tai Secondary School - Changed name to Clementi Woods Secondary School in 2006.
 Jubilee Primary School - Closed down in 1997.
 Yusof Ishak Secondary School (Formerly Jubilee Integrated Secondary School) - Moved to Bukit Batok in 1998.
 Clementi Woods Secondary School - Merged with Tanglin Secondary School in 2016.

Politics
Currently, West Coast is a part of West Coast ward within the West Coast GRC, its current MP is S Iswaran.

References

Clementi
Places in Singapore
West Region, Singapore